60th Anniversary Additional Commemorative Non-Aligned Meeting is the 11–12 October 2021 Non-Aligned Movement commemorative meeting taking place in Belgrade, Serbia. The meeting was organized by the Ministry of Foreign Affairs of Serbia, and cohosted with Azerbaijan, in commemoration to the 1st Summit of the Non-Aligned Movement. President Ilham Aliyev made opening speech in a video format. Minister of Foreign Affairs of Serbia Nikola Selaković underlined that his county's strategic and essential goal is membership in the European Union, but that Serbia will not give up on its traditional friends which are not only Russia or China but all member states of the Non-Aligned Movement. While reflecting on historical achievements Indian representative Meenakashi Lekhi invited honest introspection if movement is to keep its relevance and called unnamed member states to avoid insistence on divisive issues and bilateral score-settling which make NAM increasingly ineffective. Participants vocally decried the disparity in vaccine access between developed and developing countries.

Participants

The event is taking place at the Belgrade Fair with attendees including President of Ghana Nana Akufo-Addo, Abd al-Hakim (son of Gamal Abdel Nasser), 40 ministers of foreign affairs (including for the first time Minister of Foreign Affairs of Russia Sergey Lavrov not as a guest but an observer). Secretary General of the United Nations António Guterres stressed that the event is taking place in the situation of exceptional global challenges.

Delegation of Cyprus, one of the founding members and one of only a couple of former European members, was notably absent with Ministry of Foreign Affairs of Cyprus avoiding to comment the Radio Free Europe quest and with media implying it was result of country's poor relations with cohost county of Azerbaijan.

Turkish Minister of Foreign Affairs Mevlüt Çavuşoğlu was invited as a special guest. Turkish diplomat Volkan Bozkır was previously president of Seventy-fifth session of the United Nations General Assembly. Minister of Foreign Affairs of Serbia Nikola Selaković described the event as the largest diplomatic gathering in Europe taking place during the Covid pandemic expecting to bring together 550 attendees from 105 countries and 11 organisations.

Delegates

Members
; Aymen Benabderrahmane
; Tete António
; Paul Chet Greene
; Jeyhun Bayramov
; AK Abdul Momen
; Alpha Barry
; Ouch Borith
; Osman Saleh Mohammed
; Nana Akufo-Addo
; Joseph Hamilton
; Meenakshi Lekhi
; Retno Marsudi
; Mehdi Safari
; Fuad Hussein
; Ahmad Nasser Al-Mohammad Al-Sabah
; Abdallah Bou Habib
; Omar Hilale
; Narayan Khadka
; Denis Moncada Colindres
; Geoffrey Onyeama
; Riyad al-Maliki
; Mark Brantley
; Faisal bin Farhan Al Saud
; Mariam al-Mahdi
; Faisal Mekdad

Observers
; Milorad Dodik
; Zdenko Lucić
; Sergey Lavrov
; host of the meeting with multiple official representatives involved.

Guests
; Stanislav Raščan
; Mevlüt Çavuşoğlu

Events and initiatives
The City of Belgrade prolonged the opening hours of various services (restricted due to pandemic) to welcome numerous foreign guests. President of the Seventy-sixth session of the United Nations General Assembly hosted the sidelines Meeting of Women Heads of Delegations and Ministers of Foreign Affairs at the UN House in Belgrade. Minister of Foreign Affairs of Indonesia Retno Marsudi highlighted the Indonesian nomination of the Archive of the First NAM Conference to the Memory of the World program of UNESCO. Saint Kitts and Nevis and Burkina Faso signed a formal diplomatic relations and visa waiver agreement at the margins of the meeting. During the meeting with Riyad al-Maliki President of Serbia Vučić reiterated that his country will not move its embassy to Jerusalem as it was planned in the 2020 Washington Agreement.

Criticism
The event was criticized by University of Graz professor Florian Bieber as an outlived unprincipled autocrats gathering in service of Serbian president policy agenda. The President of Kosovo Vjosa Osmani who said that Belgrade is abusing the Non-Aligned Movement to distort the truth about Kosovo  and called Serbia a colonizer country. The head of the Serbian Government’s Office for Kosovo Petar Petković answered that Osmani’s criticism are motivated by her anxiety arising from the loss of international support.

Notes and references

Notes

References

See also
 50th Anniversary Additional Commemorative Non-Aligned Meeting
 Yugoslavia and the Non-Aligned Movement
 1st Summit of the Non-Aligned Movement
 9th Summit of the Non-Aligned Movement
 Museum of African Art, Belgrade
 Museum of Yugoslavia
 Archives of Yugoslavia

Anniversary
Foreign relations of Serbia
2021 conferences
2021 in politics
2021 in Serbia